Bee Fork is a stream in Reynolds County in the U.S. state of Missouri. It is a tributary of the West Fork Black River.

Bee Fork was so named due to the presence of honeybees in the area.

See also
List of rivers of Missouri

References

Rivers of Reynolds County, Missouri
Rivers of Missouri
Tributaries of the Black River (Arkansas–Missouri)